AHD or Ahd may refer to:

Linguistics 
 Althochdeutsch (Ahd.), the German name for Old High German
 The American Heritage Dictionary of the English Language

Medicine 
 Alveolar hydatid disease, a parasitic disease

Other uses 

 Acoustic Hailing Device
 Ahd Party, a Jordanian political party
 Ardmore Downtown Executive Airport, Oklahoma, IATA code AHD
 Ashtead railway station, Surrey, England, station code
 Audio High Density, a digital disc format
 Australian Height Datum